In metaphysics, the distinction between abstract and concrete refers to a divide between two types of entities. Many philosophers hold that this difference has fundamental metaphysical significance. Examples of concrete objects include plants, human beings and planets while things like numbers, sets and propositions are abstract objects. There is no general consensus as to what the characteristic marks of concreteness and abstractness are. Popular suggestions include defining the distinction in terms of the difference between (1) existence inside or outside space-time, (2) having causes and effects or not, (3) having contingent or necessary existence, (4) being particular or universal and (5) belonging to either the physical or the mental realm or to neither. Despite this diversity of views, there is broad agreement concerning most objects as to whether they are abstract or concrete. So under most interpretations, all these views would agree that, for example, plants are concrete objects while numbers are abstract objects.

Abstract objects are most commonly used in philosophy and semantics. They are sometimes called abstracta in contrast to concreta. The term abstract object is said to have been coined by Willard Van Orman Quine. Abstract object theory is a discipline that studies the nature and role of abstract objects. It holds that properties can be related to objects in two ways: through exemplification and through encoding. Concrete objects exemplify their properties while abstract objects merely encode them. This approach is also known as the dual copula strategy.

In philosophy
The type–token distinction identifies physical objects that are tokens of a particular type of thing.  The "type" of which it is a part is in itself an abstract object. The abstract–concrete distinction is often introduced and initially understood in terms of paradigmatic examples of objects of each kind:

Abstract objects have often garnered the interest of philosophers because they raise problems for popular theories. In ontology, abstract objects are considered problematic for physicalism and some forms of naturalism. Historically, the most important ontological dispute about abstract objects has been the problem of universals. In epistemology, abstract objects are considered problematic for empiricism. If abstracta lack causal powers and spatial location, how do we know about them? It is hard to say how they can affect our sensory experiences, and yet we seem to agree on a wide range of claims about them.

Some, such as Ernst Mally, Edward Zalta and arguably, Plato in his Theory of Forms, have held that abstract objects constitute the defining subject matter of metaphysics or philosophical inquiry more broadly. To the extent that philosophy is independent of empirical research, and to the extent that empirical questions do not inform questions about abstracta, philosophy would seem especially suited to answering these latter questions.

In modern philosophy, the distinction between abstract and concrete was explored by Immanuel Kant and G. W. F. Hegel.

Gottlob Frege said that abstract objects, such as numbers, were members of a third realm, different from the external world or from internal consciousness. (See Popper's three worlds.)

Abstract objects and causality
Another popular proposal for drawing the abstract–concrete distinction contends that an object is abstract if it lacks causal power. A causal power has the ability to affect something causally. Thus, the empty set is abstract because it cannot act on other objects. One problem with this view is that it is not clear exactly what it is to have causal power. For a more detailed exploration of the abstract–concrete distinction, see the relevant Stanford Encyclopedia of Philosophy article.

Quasi-abstract entities
Recently, there has been some philosophical interest in the development of a third category of objects known as the quasi-abstract.  Quasi-abstract objects have drawn particular attention in the area of social ontology and documentality. Some argue that the over-adherence to the platonist duality of the concrete and the abstract has led to a large category of social objects having been overlooked or rejected as nonexistent because they exhibit characteristics that the traditional duality between concrete and abstract regards as incompatible. Specifically, the ability to have temporal location, but not spatial location, and have causal agency (if only by acting through representatives). These characteristics are exhibited by a number of social objects, including states of the international legal system.

Concrete and abstract thought in psychology

Jean Piaget uses the terms "concrete" and "formal" to describe two different types of learning. Concrete thinking involves facts and descriptions about everyday, tangible objects, while abstract (formal operational) thinking involves a mental process.

See also

References

Sources

External links
 
 Nominalism, Realism, Conceptualism, from The Catholic Encyclopedia
  Abstract vs. Concrete in Writing, from Writing for Results

Abstract object theory
Abstraction
Cognition
Concepts in metaphysics
Consciousness
Metaphysical theories
Metaphysics of mind
Theory of mind
Syntax–semantics interface